United Nations Security Council Resolution 223, adopted unanimously on June 21, 1966, after examining the application of Guyana for membership in the United Nations the Council recommended to the General Assembly that Guyana be admitted.

A representative from Venezuela was also present at the meeting but could not vote.

See also
List of United Nations Security Council Resolutions 201 to 300 (1965–1971)

References
Text of the Resolution at undocs.org

External links
 

 0223
foreign relations of Guyana
History of Guyana
1966 in Guyana
 0223
 0223
June 1966 events